Goshen Pass Natural Area Preserve is a  Natural Area Preserve located in Rockbridge County, Virginia.  The oldest state-managed natural area in Virginia, it was first acquired in 1954 to help protect views of the gorge along the Maury River.  The site contains stands of chestnut oak, pine-oak-heath woodland, rocky scrub communities, regionally rare plants such as freshwater cordgrass (Spartina pectinata), and habitat for the Appalachian jewelwing, a locally rare damselfly.  The site was dedicated as a preserve in 2001.

Goshen Pass Natural Area Preserve is owned and maintained by the Virginia Department of Conservation and Recreation. The preserve is open to the public, however as it is contiguous with the Goshen and Little North Mountain Wildlife Management Area (WMA), a WMA access permit is required for parking.

See also
Goshen Pass
Goshen Scout Reservation
List of Virginia Natural Area Preserves

References

External links
Virginia Department of Conservation and Recreation: Goshen Pass Natural Area Preserve

Virginia Natural Area Preserves
Protected areas of Rockbridge County, Virginia
Protected areas established in 2001